Alfred or Alf Bishop may refer to:
 Alf Bishop (footballer, born 1886) (1886–1938), English footballer with Wolverhampton Wanderers 
 Alf Bishop (footballer, born 1902) (1902–1944), English footballer with Southampton and Barrow 
 Henry Alfred Bishop (1860–1934), American politician and railroad man